The Flower Kings are a Swedish progressive rock band formed in 1994 by guitarist and singer-songwriter Roine Stolt. The group began as Stolt's touring band to support his third solo album The Flower King. They continued performing after the tour and have gone on to become one of the most prolific studio recording units in progressive rock, having released over twenty hours of music spread across fifteen studio albums. Their music is similar to early symphonic progressive rock groups such as Yes, marked by sharp dynamic changes, polyrhythms, heavy bass, vocal harmonies, abstract and occasionally nonsensical lyrics, and extended song lengths.

History

Formation
In early 1993, guitarist and singer Roine Stolt had written material for his third solo album The Flower King and sought for musicians to perform it. He had wanted to release a progressive rock-style album for a while and felt the time was right to pursue the project. The album features Stolt on vocals, guitar, bass and keyboards, Jaime Salazar on drums, and Hasse Fröberg on vocals, and was recorded in Sweden between May 1993 and January 1994.

In preparation for Stolt's concert tour to support the album's release, Stolt, Salazar, and Fröberg were joined by Stolt's brother Michael on bass and Tomas Bodin on keyboards. The five performed their first gig on 20 August 1994 at an outdoor festival in Uppsala, Stolt's hometown and the city where The Flower King was recorded. After they decided to become a full time band, they officially adopted the name The Flower Kings, named after Stolt's album. Stolt had produced a list of potential titles for the record, one of which was "The Flower King", and chose it because of its positive meaning and its reference to the hippie era of the 1960s.

Activity
After performing a series of concerts through 1994, the band entered the studio in December 1994 to record their debut album, Back in the World of Adventures. The recording process was gradual, finishing in September 1995.

In 2000, Michael Stolt was replaced by Jonas Reingold. Two years later, Salazar was replaced by Zoltan Csörsz. Daniel Gildenlöw of Pain of Salvation joined the band the same year as a multi-instrumentalist and vocalist.

Other contributors have included Hasse Bruniusson (percussion) and Ulf Wallander (saxophone).

Stolt has written the vast majority of the material the band has recorded, with Bodin contributing most of the rest. The music is best described as symphonic progressive rock, bearing a strong resemblance to the music of Yes, King Crimson, Gentle Giant, and early Genesis, with jazz fusion and blues influences. The band's lyrics are almost uniformly positive and uplifting, affirming such values as love, peace, and spirituality, and furthering their association with Yes.

Their 1999 album Flower Power contains the eighteen-section, almost 60-minute "Garden of Dreams".

In June 2007, they released The Road Back Home, a compilation of remixed songs from 1994 to 2006, plus "Little Deceiver" (a previously unreleased track) and the full version of their cover of "The Cinema Show" by Genesis.

Zoltan Csörsz was replaced by new drummer Marcus Liliequist for one album, but returned for the 2007 album, The Sum of No Evil. He was subsequently replaced by Erik Hammarström in 2008.

In 2008, Ola Heden, previously of Reingold's side project Karmakanic, joined on guitar, vocals and keyboards.

In November 2008, the band were the opening act of the Ecco Prog Fest in Moscow.

After touring in 2008, The Flower Kings were inactive for four years. Stolt felt the band had varied levels of focus in their direction and had started to feel lost. They reunited in 2011 to work on new material after Stolt felt it was the right time and sensed eagerness from the other members to work together. This marked the arrival of German drummer Felix Lehrmann. Banks of Eden, the group's eleventh album, was released in June 2012 and was recorded with analogue recording techniques and styles reminiscent of the height of vinyl records. This was followed by Desolation Rose in October 2013.

The line up of Stolt, Bodin, Reingold, Fröberg and Lehrmann played together for the last time in 2015. 2016 and 2017 saw the bandmembers busy with other engagements. 

In December 2017, the first part of a career-spanning box set titled A Kingdom of Colours was released. This first box, with 10 discs, covers the period from 1995 to 2002 and includes the studio albums from Back in the World of Adventures to Unfold the Future. The second box set, titled A Kingdom of Colours 2 and covering the albums Adam and Eve through to Desolation Rose, was released in June 2018.

In September 2018, Stolt announced a new album named Manifesto of an Alchemist. The album did not feature long-time keyboardist Tomas Bodin, and as such it is credited to "Roine Stolt's The Flower King" rather than "The Flower Kings"

In August the same year Roine Stolt presented a new band called "Roine Stolt and friends play The Flower Kings". The band featured Stolt, Fröberg and Reingold with new keyboard player Zach Kamins and new drummer Mirko De Maio. Roine Stolt stated that he was done being in a group and wanted to tour as a solo artist like Roger Waters or Steven Wilson. Tomas Bodin was not a part of this group and made his displeasure quite public. The band toured with Spock’s Beard in November and December 2018 and continued to do shows in 2019, this time under the name "The Flower Kings Revisited".

In July 2019, "Revisited" was removed from the band name, making it clear that this line up was now "The Flower Kings". The band went on to release the double albums Waiting for Miracles in 2019 and Islands in 2020, the latter having been recorded entirely remotely during the COVID-19 pandemic.

On 24 March 2021, Roine Stolt announced two big projects. The Flower Kings are working on a brand new album "in the same innocence" of Stardust We Are.

On 19 April 2021, Roine officially teases that Stardust We Are is getting a brand new vinyl remaster. 

On April 8th 2022, InsideOut and Roine Stolt announced that Back in the World of Adventures and Retropolis were getting "remastered and partly remixed". The release date for both was placed on May 27th 2022. Also Stardust We Are and Flower Power are getting remixes and remastered in June.

Personnel
Current members
 Roine Stolt – guitar, vocals, keyboards, bass guitar (1994–present)
 Hasse Fröberg – vocals, guitar, acoustic guitar (1994–present)
 Michael Stolt – bass guitar (1994–1999; 2021-present)
 Zach Kamins – keyboards (2018-present)
 Mirko DeMaio – drums (2018-present)

Former members
 Jaime Salazar – drums (1994–2001)
 Tomas Bodin – keyboards (1994–2015)
 Jonas Reingold – bass (1999–2021)
 Felix Lehrmann – drums (2011–2015)
 Zoltan Csörsz – drums (2002–2004; 2007–2008)
 Daniel Gildenlöw – vocals, guitars, keyboards (2002–2004)
 Marcus Liliequist – drums (2005–2006)

Guest musicians
 Hasse Bruniusson – percussion (1995–present)
 Ulf Wallander – saxophone (1995–present)
 Pat Mastelotto – drums (2007)
 Erik Hammarström – drums (2008)
 Ola Heden – vocals, keyboards, guitar (2008)

Timeline

Discography

Studio albums

Live albums
 Alive on Planet Earth (2000)
 Meet the Flower Kings (2003) 
 Instant DeLIVEry (2006) 
 Tour Kaputt (2011)

Official bootlegs
 Édition Limitée Québec (1998) 
 Live in New York – Official Bootleg (2002)
 BetchaWannaDanceStoopid!!! (2004)
 Carpe Diem – The Flower Kings Live in USA (2008)

Fan Club albums
 Fan Club 2000 (2000)
 Fan Club 2002 (2002)
 Fan Club 2004 (2004)
 Fan Club 2005 / Harvest (2005)

Compilations
 Scanning the Greenhouse (1998)
 The Road Back Home (2007)

Box sets
 A Kingdom of Colours: The Complete Collection From 1995 to 2002 (2017)
 A Kingdom of Colours II: The Complete Collection From 2004 to 2013 (2018)

References

External links
 Official website

Swedish progressive rock groups
Musical groups established in 1994
Symphonic rock groups
1994 establishments in Sweden
Inside Out Music artists
Century Media Records artists